The Anáhuac Station is part of the expansion of Line 2 of the Monterrey Metro.

This station was planned to be a hub for the "Transmetro" BRT program, but those plans were later scrapped.

This station serves the San Nicolás centre and the Anahuác neighborhood, from which the station takes its name. It is accessible for people with disabilities.

Its logo represents the tower of the House of Culture La Pérgola, which is representative of the neighborhood. The station was opened on 1 October 2008 as part of the extension of the line from Universidad and Sendero.

See also
List of Monterrey metro stations

References

Metrorrey stations
Railway stations opened in 2008